Kanah Shenelle Andrews-Nahu (born 18 January 2001) is a New Zealand weightlifter. She won the bronze medal in the girls' +63kg event at the 2018 Summer Youth Olympics held in Buenos Aires, Argentina. At the time, she finished in 4th place but Supatchanin Khamhaeng of Thailand was stripped of her gold medal after testing positive for a banned substance.

Career 

At the 2019 Junior World Weightlifting Championships held in Suva, Fiji, she won the gold medal in the women's 76kg Snatch event and the bronze medal in the women's 76kg event. As a result, she became the first weightlifter from New Zealand to win a gold medal at this event. A month later, at the 2019 Pacific Games held in Apia, Samoa, she won the gold medal in the women's 76kg event.

She represented New Zealand at the 2020 Summer Olympics in Tokyo, Japan. She finished in 13th place in the women's 87 kg event.

Achievements

References

External links 
 

Living people
2001 births
Sportspeople from Auckland
New Zealand female weightlifters
Weightlifters at the 2018 Summer Youth Olympics
Weightlifters at the 2020 Summer Olympics
Olympic weightlifters of New Zealand
21st-century New Zealand women